The Republic of Sakha is the only federal subject of Russia which uses more than one time zone. Sakha spans three time zones.

History

Decree No. 725 of 31 August 2011 changed Moscow Time (MSK) from UTC+03:00, or UTC+04:00 during with seasonal daylight saving time (DST), to UTC+04:00 all year. Therefore, the time zones of Sakha, which were MSK+6, MSK+7 and MSK+8, changed from UTC+09:00, UTC+10:00 and UTC+11:00 (or UTC+10:00, UTC+11:00 and UTC+12:00 during DST) to UTC+10:00, UTC+11:00 and UTC+12:00 all year. As the decree took effect when DST was already observed, there was no change in local time in most of Sakha. However, the decree also changed the offset of some parts of Sakha with respect to Moscow Time (MSK), and thus to UTC.

On 26 October 2014, Moscow Time reverted to UTC+03:00, also without seasonal changes. The time offset in all parts of Sakha with respect to Moscow Time remained the same (MSK+6, MSK+7, MSK+8), but changed with respect to UTC (becoming again UTC+09:00, UTC+10:00, UTC+11:00).

IANA time zone database

External links
 http://efele.net/maps/tz/russia/ map showing IANA zones for Russia - five zones for Sakha

References

Time in Russia